Capidava is a genus of South American jumping spiders that was first described by Eugène Louis Simon in 1902.

Species
 it contains six species, found only in Brazil and Guyana:
Capidava annulipes Caporiacco, 1947 – Guyana
Capidava auriculata Simon, 1902 (type) – Brazil
Capidava biuncata Simon, 1902 – Brazil
Capidava dubia Caporiacco, 1947 – Guyana
Capidava saxatilis Soares & Camargo, 1948 – Brazil
Capidava uniformis Mello-Leitão, 1940 – Guyana

References

Salticidae
Salticidae genera
Spiders of South America